Wílliam Ruben Martínez Carreras (January 13, 1928 – December 28, 1997) was a Uruguayan footballer. He played 54 times for the Uruguay national football team between 1950 and 1965.

Martínez came through the youth team of local side Sportivo Alba de Victoria and signed on as a youth player for Nacional in 1962. After playing for Nacional at various youth levels and for the first team he joined Racing Club de Montevideo in 1947.

In 1948, he joined Rampla Juniors, where he spent 7 seasons before joining Peñarol

It was with Peñarol that Martínez enjoyed most of his success at the club level. During his time with the club he captained the team to five consecutive league titles (1958–1962), two Copa Libertadores (1960, 1961), the Copa Intercontinental in 1961 and four consecutive editions of the Copa Uruguay (1958–1961).

In 1963 Martínez returned to Rampla Juniors, in 1967 he joined Atlético Junior in Colombia before returning for a third spell with Rampla Juniors.

In the last years of his playing career he worked as the player-manager of Fenix and Central Español. He retired from football in 1970 at the age of 42.

International career
Martínez was in the Uruguay squads for three FIFA World Cup tournaments (1950, 1954 and 1962). He played a total of 54 matches scoring 2 goals.

Martínez won the Copa América with Uruguay in 1956, he also played in three other editions of the tournament (1953, 1955 and 1959A).

Honours
Nacional
 Primera División Uruguaya: 1943, 1946
 Torneo de Honor: 1943, 1946
 Torneo Competencia: 1945
 Copa de Confraternidad Escobar – Gerona: 1945
 Copa Aldao: 1946

Rampla Juniors
 Torneo Competencia: 1950
 Torneo Cuadrangular: 1953

C.A. Peñarol
 Primera División Uruguaya: 1958, 1959, 1960, 1961, 1962
 Torneo Competencia: 1956, 1957
 Torneo de Honor: 1956
 Cuadrangular Tournament: 1955, 1957, 1959, 1960
 Cuadrangular in Mexico: 1957
 Copa Libertadores: 1960, 1961
 Intercontinental Cup: 1961

Uruguay
 1950 FIFA World Cup: 1950
 1956 South American Championship: 1956

References

External links

World Cup Champions Squads 1930 – 2002
A primeira grande zebra do Mundial 

1928 births
1997 deaths
Association football defenders
Uruguayan footballers
Uruguay international footballers
1950 FIFA World Cup players
1954 FIFA World Cup players
1962 FIFA World Cup players
Copa Libertadores-winning players
FIFA World Cup-winning players
Uruguayan Primera División players
Categoría Primera A players
Club Nacional de Football players
Racing Club de Montevideo players
Peñarol players
Rampla Juniors players
Centro Atlético Fénix players
Central Español players
Uruguayan football managers
Central Español managers
Centro Atlético Fénix managers
Uruguayan expatriate footballers
Expatriate footballers in Colombia
Copa América-winning players
Atlético Junior managers